Title 9 of the United States Code outlines the role of arbitration in the United States Code.

Chapters 
 : General Provisions
 : Convention on the Recognition and Enforcement of Foreign Arbitral Awards
 : Inter-American Convention on International Commercial Arbitration

The Inter-American Convention on International Commercial Arbitration was adopted on 30 January 1975 and entered into force for the United States on 27 October 1990.

References

External links
U.S. Code Title 9, via United States Government Printing Office
U.S. Code Title 9, via Cornell University

09
Arbitration law